Selwyn is a township in central-eastern Ontario, Canada, located in Peterborough County.

Formerly known as Smith-Ennismore-Lakefield, the township passed a by-law changing its name to Selwyn in 2012. The change became official on January 15, 2013.

History

On January 1, 1998, Ennismore and Smith Townships were merged to form the Township of Smith-Ennismore. On January 1, 2001, a Minister's Order created the township in its current form by amalgamating the formerly independent Village of Lakefield with the Township of Smith-Ennismore and part of Douro–Dummer Township.

On December 11, 2012 the township council voted to select a new name after Canada Post notified many residents that addresses would have to be changed to reflect the municipality due to a phasing out of its rural route system. By a vote of 3 to 2, the township council voted to adopt the new name of Selwyn.

Geography
The township comprises the communities of: Bridgenorth, Chemong Heights, Chemong Park, Connaught Shore, Deer Bay, Emerald Isle, Ennismore, Fife's Bay, Flood's Landing, Fowlers Corners, Gannon Beach, Gannon Village, Kawartha Park, Kimberley Park, Lakefield, Selwyn, Selwyn Shores, Stewart Heights, Tera View Heights, Tindle Bay, Victoria Springs, Village Meadows, Windward Sands, Woodland Acres, Young's Cove, Young's Point and Youngstown.

The township is 67 percent rural including small villages and hamlets, along with the urban areas of Lakefield, Bridgenorth - Chemong Park, and Woodland Acres (part of the urban area of Peterborough). Farms have been established on most of the flat areas, which are intermixed between the rolling hills and lakes. The Trent-Severn Waterway passes through the township.

Demographics 

Mother tongue:
 English as first language: 92.4%
 French as first language: 1.3%
 English and French as first language: 0%
 Other as first language: 6.3%

Economy
The region is in the heart of Ontario's eastern cottage country, where urban residents (mostly from the Toronto region) have cottages on many of the small lakes. Many of the retail and services offered in the region cater to this seasonal market.

Small scale farms are a large industry, and dairy and meat production are some of the notable goods.

Government
In the 2010 municipal election, Mary Smith won the position of reeve (now mayor) from former reeve Ron Millen by 1,355 votes. Former federal Member of Parliament Andy Mitchell succeeded Smith as deputy reeve.

Education
Near the village is Lakefield College School which Prince Andrew, Duke of York attended in 1977. The campus was the filming location for the 1977 Canadian film Age of Innocence/Ragtime Summer. In the village itself is the Lakefield District Public School, which opened in 2018 after the Ridpath Junior Public School, named after James William Ridpath, publisher in the late 19th century and early 20th century of the Lakefield News, local businessman, sportsman and dignitary, was closed. LDPS took over the building formerly used for the now closed Lakefield District Secondary School. St. Paul's Catholic School, which is situated very close to the high school, is the area parochial school.

In fiction
In Paul Nicholas Mason's novel Battered Soles (2005), Lakefield is the site of a pilgrimage, begun in July 1997, which sees thousands of pilgrims from all over the world walk from Peterborough along the Rotary Greenway Trail to St. John's Anglican Church in the village. The focus of the pilgrimage is a life-sized statue of a blue-skinned Jesus in the basement of the church. Mason's second novel, The Red Dress (2008), is also set in Lakefield, although this time the community is thinly-disguised as Greenfield.

In film
 Lakefield and Lakefield College School were used as the location for the 1977 Canadian film Age of Innocence (aka Ragtime Summer) starring David Warner, Honor Blackman and Trudy Young. One memorable scene was shot at the location of the old Lakefield train station on Stanley St. The first four letters were removed on the Lakefield sign and replaced with the name Rockfield.
 In the winter of 2010 Verizon made a commercial at Lakefield's Ontario Speed Skating Oval outdoor speed skating rink.
 Unheralded (2011), a National Film Board documentary directed by Aaron Hancox, is about the Lakefield Herald. It focuses on this community paper's journalists as they cover newsworthy events taking place in and around the town.

Notable people
Charles Arkoll Boulton, former councillor and reeve, left Ontario and later became Senator for Marquette, Manitoba
Sebastian Bach, rock singer, notable for being the lead singer of the band Skid Row
Ronnie "The Hawk" Hawkins, American-born Canadian country musician
Margaret Laurence, novelist
Leahy Family, band
Susanna Moodie, pioneer, writer and newspaper editor
Paul Nicholas Mason, writer
Paul Reddick, blues-rock artist, songwriter, and harp player
Bruce Ridpath, professional ice hockey player who played on the 1911 Stanley Cup champion Ottawa Senators
Catharine Parr Traill, English-born pioneer, writer, naturalist (sister of Susanna Moodie)
Mike Fisher, professional hockey player for the Nashville Predators, grew up in Bridgenorth
Paul Soles, voice actor famous for being the voice of Hermey in Rudolph the Red-nosed Reindeer and Spider-man in the 1960’s
 Thomas Toth, Canadian runner.
Tyler Ardron, Canadian international rugby player, Super Rugby player (Waikato Chiefs), ITM Cup player (Bay of Plenty)
Trevor Jones, Canadian Rower

See also
List of townships in Ontario

References

External links 

Lower-tier municipalities in Ontario
Municipalities in Peterborough County
Township municipalities in Ontario